Çiçəkli (known as Arabachy until 2015) is a village in the Gadabay District of Azerbaijan. The village forms part of the municipality of Shahdagh (formerly, Shurakend).

References 

Populated places in Gadabay District